AUO may refer to:
AU Optronics
Auburn-Opelika Robert G. Pitts Airport